Mahsun Çapkan (born 8 October 1999) is a Turkish professional footballer who plays as a winger for TFF Second League club Batman Petrolspor on loan from Çaykur Rizespor.

Professional career
Çapkan made his debut for Fenerbahçe in a 1–0 Europa League loss to FC Spartak Trnava on 13 December 2018.

References

External links
 
 
 

1999 births
Living people
People from Güngören
Footballers from Istanbul
Turkish footballers
Turkey youth international footballers
Fenerbahçe S.K. footballers
Süper Lig players
Association football midfielders